Sharon Duce (born 17 January 1950) is a British actress.

Born in Sheffield, she trained at the Webber Douglas Academy of Dramatic Art then became a stage actress at the Sheffield Repertory Theatre, the York Theatre Royal, and the Theatre in the Round, before joining Ian McKellen and Edward Petherbridges Actors Company. Apart from her career in film and television, she has had leading roles at the Royal Court Theatre and other West End theatres.

She has two children with the former actor Dominic Guard, with whom she appeared in the 1978 film Absolution.

Selected filmography
Her best known screen role was with Ray Brooks in the BBC comedy drama Big Deal (1984). Another notable role: In 2000, she appeared in The Royle Family Christmas special as Valerie. She has also appeared in:
Crown Court (working girl, 1976)
Big Deal  
 Buddy's Song
Clocking Off
Coronation Street 
Doctor Who (episode: Ghost Light)
Emmerdale
 Funny Man
London's Burning
Midsomer Murders
Minder
Moving On
Outland
The Bill
The Professionals
The Royle Family
Tales of the Unexpected
The Tomorrow People 
Vera
Wycliffe
Z-Cars

In 1992 she was reunited with Brooks to star in the BBC drama series Growing Pains, in which they played middle-aged foster parents. She also guest starred for two episodes in February 1992 in ITV's BAFTA award-winning series for teenagers, Press Gang, playing Spike Thomson's mother. Duce appeared in Coronation Street as Julie Carp's mother, Paula Carp, but she left the soap on 22 May 2009.

References

External links

1948 births
English soap opera actresses
English television actresses
Living people
Actresses from Sheffield